Walid Al Shurafa (Arabic:  وليد الشرفا)  (born 1973) is a Palestinian playwright, novelist, and media studies academic. He was born in Nablus, and now teaches at Birzeit University. Shurafa has published a play, The People's Court  (1991), and two novels, Coming from the Resurrection (2013) and Heir of the Tombstones (2017). Heir of the Tombstones was shortlisted for the 2018 International Prize for Arabic Fiction. He is also the author of nonfiction books From Discourse Power to Power of Discourse, on the use of media by Al Jazeera and the Muslim Brotherhood during the Arab Spring uprisings, and Edward Said and Criticism of the Reincarnation of Orientalism, on the representation of Eastern cultures in Western media.

Works

Play 

 The People's Court (Original title: Makamat Al Sha'ab), 1991

Novels 

 Coming from the Resurrection (Original title: Qakem Min Al Qiyama), 2013
 Heir of the Tombstons (Original title: Warth Al Shawahad), 2017

References

Palestinian writers
1973 births
Living people